Sterphus hinei is a species of Hoverfly in the family Syrphidae.

Distribution
Honduras.

References

Eristalinae
Insects described in 1976
Diptera of South America
Taxa named by F. Christian Thompson